Giulio or Giuliano Dinarelli (1629–1671) was an Italian painter of the Baroque period, active in Bologna. He was a pupil of Guido Reni.

References

1629 births
1671 deaths
Italian Baroque painters
17th-century Italian painters
Italian male painters
Painters from Bologna